Following an upward trajectory in the past five years; The Seven Network was tipped to have the highest network share in 2002, following a highly publicized corporate shuffle at the Nine Network, which saw its CEO, David Leckie replaced after the network lost 11 out of 40 rating weeks to Channel 7 in the previous year. Under new management, the Nine Network made considerable tweaks to its programming schedule, most notably discontinuing the game show, Sale of the Century after nearly two decades on air.

However, despite the early media buzz, Channel Seven's reining success did not eventuate and the network struggled without the 2002 AFL season (which was now broadcast by the Nine Network), whilst audience numbers for their other offerings dipping significantly. Moreover, The Weakest Link, a ratings hit in 2001, disappeared mysteriously from Seven's schedule by late April. Seven's ‘5-City’ share plummeted to new lows and after just six weeks into the official ratings season they found themselves in third place behind Nine and Channel Ten. Seven's share would recover in the latter half of the year but came nowhere near rivaling Nine for top spot.

Consequently, 2002 was easily Channel Nine's year; losing only three out of the 40 official ratings weeks, with Seven winning the three weeks with Winter Olympics & Commonwealth Games coverage. The network dominated the most watched broadcast lists; with Nine News and A Current Affair consistently beating competition from main rival, Seven. However 2002 also marked the beginning of the rise of the Ten Network which had some significant programming success in this year. Ten scored another news coup; after being the first TV network to begin rolling reportage of the 11 September attacks in 2001 – 2002 saw them with the most watched news bulletin for the year with its ‘First at Five’ service reporting on the Bali Bombings of 13 October.

A notable event occurred on 11 March 2002 where Nine's Who Wants to Be a Millionaire? outrated Seven's The Weakest Link: The Mole Special, with 1.51 million viewers compared to 1.312 million. The latter episode saw a record low of $14,100 won, which was rounded up to $15,000 on The Mole. That show never returned to its dominance in 2000 when the show first appeared on Seven, causing the following season to be moved to a later time in 2003.

The following is a list of Australian television ratings for the year 2002.

Most Watched Broadcasts in 2002

See also

Television ratings in Australia

References

2002
2002 in Australian television